Þverfellshorn is a peak in the Esjan mountains of Capital Region (Greater Reykjavík) in southwestern Iceland. It is one of the most visited peaks in Iceland, attracting hikers for its scenic views.
Its elevation range is  - . The car park at the foot of the mountain is known as "Mógilsá".

References

Mountains of Iceland
Geography of Reykjavík
Tourist attractions in Reykjavík